In mathematics, particularly topology, a comb space is a particular subspace of  that resembles a comb. The comb space has properties that serve as a number of counterexamples. The topologist's sine curve has similar properties to the comb space.  The deleted comb space is a variation on the comb space.

Formal definition

Consider  with its standard topology and let K be the set . The set C defined by:

considered as a subspace of  equipped with the subspace topology is known as the comb space. The deleted comb space, D, is defined by:

.

This is the comb space with the line segment  deleted.

Topological properties

The comb space and the deleted comb space have some interesting topological properties mostly related to the notion of connectedness.

1. The comb space, C, is path connected and contractible, but not locally contractible, locally path connected, or locally connected.

2. The deleted comb space, D, is connected:

Let E be the comb space without .  E is also path connected and the closure of E is the comb space. As E  D  the closure of E, where E is connected, the deleted comb space is also connected.

3. The deleted comb space is not path connected since there is no path from (0,1) to (0,0):

Suppose there is a path from p = (0, 1) to the point (0, 0) in D. Let ƒ : [0, 1] → D be this path. We shall prove that ƒ −1{p} is both open and closed in [0, 1] contradicting the connectedness of this set. Clearly we have ƒ −1{p} is closed in [0, 1] by the continuity of ƒ. To prove that ƒ −1{p} is open, we proceed as follows: Choose a neighbourhood V (open in R2) about p that doesn’t intersect the x–axis. Suppose x is an arbitrary point in ƒ −1{p}. Clearly, f(x) = p. Then since f −1(V) is open, there is a basis element U containing x such that ƒ(U) is a subset of V.  We assert that ƒ(U) = {p} which will mean that U is an open subset of ƒ −1{p} containing x. Since x was arbitrary, ƒ −1{p} will then be open. We know that U is connected since it is a basis element for the order topology on [0, 1]. Therefore, ƒ(U) is connected. Suppose ƒ(U) contains a point s other than p.  Then s = (1/n, z) must belong to D. Choose r such that 1/(n + 1) < r < 1/n. Since ƒ(U) does not intersect the x-axis, the sets A = (−∞, r) ×  and B = (r, +∞) ×  will form a separation on f(U); contradicting the connectedness of f(U). Therefore, f −1{p} is both open and closed in [0, 1]. This is a contradiction.

4. The comb space is homotopic to a point but does not admit a deformation retract onto a point for every choice of basepoint.

See also 

 Connected space
 Hedgehog space
 Infinite broom
 List of topologies
 Locally connected space
 Order topology
 Topologist's sine curve

References
 

Topological spaces
Trees (topology)